The first series of The Circle began on 18 September 2018 on Channel 4, and concluded after 21 days with a live final on 8 October 2018. This series was hosted by Alice Levine and Maya Jama on both the launch and the final, and was narrated by Sophie Willan. Ahead of the series it was announced that players would be competing against each other to become the most popular, but would never actually meet. Instead they would communicate through a specially designed app and be able to portray themselves in any way they choose. The series launched with a total of 1,607,000 including +1 catch-up services. It concluded with 1,125,000.

On 8 October 2018, the series was won by Alex Hobern, who had played the game claiming to be a 25-year-old woman called Kate, using photos of his real-life girlfriend Millie. Alex also won the "viewers champion" for an additional £25,000, claiming £75,000 in total. Freddie Bentley was the series runner-up.

Following this series, it was announced that Alice and Maya would not be returning for the second, with Emma Willis taking over the role as presenter instead.

Players
The contestants taking part in the series were revealed on 18 September 2018. However throughout the series more players joined The Circle.

Results and elimination
For the first series, the contestants rated one another out of five throughout. At the end of each ratings their average scores were revealed from highest to lowest to the players. The two highest rated players became "influencers", while the remaining players were at risk of being "blocked" by the influencers.

Notes

References

Channel 4 reality television shows
2018 British television seasons
The Circle (franchise)